dV Giochi, formerly daVinci Games, is an Italian publisher of board games and card games. The company was established in 2001 in Italy and its original name is an homage to the Italian genius and inventor Leonardo da Vinci.

After a strong initial success, it concluded trade agreements with a wide network of international partners, and its games, with the dV Giochi brand, have been distributed worldwide, winning great recognition in Italy and abroad.

Information
Once the company began working on commercials and making better relationships with international partners, the success of the company grew. dV Giochi also was able to win awards in Italy and other countries abroad. The games produced by dV Giochi are known by the highly interactive gameplay that is involved with them. The goal of the company is to provide a fun alternative to the usual forms of entertainment that include television, bars, nightclubs and movies.

dV Giochi collaborated with Mayfair Games until August 2008 and with them released the Origins award winning Bang!

Games
Other popular daVinci games are:

References

Game manufacturers
Board game publishing companies
Card game publishing companies